Klodian Skënderi (born 12 January 1984) is an Albanian retired football player. The midfielder played in the Albanian Superliga for Apolonia Fier.

External links 
 

1984 births
Living people
Association football midfielders
Albanian footballers
Flamurtari Vlorë players
KF Apolonia Fier players
KF Vlora players
Kategoria Superiore players
Kategoria e Parë players